vfs_acl_xattr

is an experimental VFS-module

of Samba.

It stores NTFS Access-Control List (ACLs) in Extended Attributes (EAs), in
addition
to storing them in Unix ACLs.
This improves compatibility with Windows ACLs, because it allows to store all flags that can be used in Windows ACLs.

References 

Free file transfer software